Music from Macbeth is a 1972 album by the Third Ear Band.  It consists of the soundtrack from Roman Polanski's 1971 film Macbeth, an adaptation  of Shakespeare's The Tragedy of Macbeth.

Composition
The band composed original music for the film, by adding electronic music to hand drums, woodwinds and strings. Elements of music in India and the Middle East and jazz were also incorporated into the score.

While the score has some Middle Ages influence, this is not found in the scenes where Duncan is assassinated and Macbeth is killed. Polanski and the band used aleatoric music for these scenes, to communicate chaos.

Track listing
"Overture" – 4:20
"The Beach" – 1:54
"Lady Macbeth" – 1:47
"Inverness: Macbeth's Return/The Preparation/Fanfare/Duncan's Arrival" – 5:00
"The Banquet" – 1:21
"Dagger and Death" – 2:49
"At the Well/The Princes's Escape/Coronation/Come Sealing Night" – 3:03
"Court Dance" – 2:28
"Fleance" – 4:02
"Grooms' Dance" – 4:21
"Bear Baiting" – 1:10
"Ambush/Banquo's Ghost" – 2:27
"Going to Bed/Blind Man's Buff/Requiescant/Sere and Yellow Leaf" – 3:04
"The Cauldron" – 2:39
"Prophesies" – 1:53
"Wicca Way" – 1:24
(All compositions by Bridges, Sweeney, Minns, and Buckmaster.)

Personnel
Paul Minns — oboe and recorder
Glen Sweeney — drums
Paul Buckmaster — cello and bass guitar
Simon House — violin and VCS3
Denim Bridges — guitars

The album also features vocals by a 12-year old Keith Chegwin.

References

Third Ear Band albums
Works based on Macbeth
1972 soundtrack albums
Harvest Records soundtracks
Drama film soundtracks